Bhilawadi is a town which located in palus taluka. it is near about only 16 km from Palus city. Bhilawadi, located on the bank of Krishna River.
This town is one of the prominent producers of Grapes and Sugar Cane in Sangli district. Bhilawadi town has won the Nirmal Gram Purskar in Sant Gadage Baba Gram Swachhata Abhiyan.

Bhilwadi has many attractions.
One of the main attractions in Bhilwadi is the beautiful river bank along Krishna River, believed to be built in year 1779.
Bhilawadi is the 1st town and Village in Maharashtra and 6th in the Country to start the day followed by National Anthem on the public addressing system.
.

Krishna Ghat
The beautiful sprawling stone structure at the banks of Krishna River is believed to be constructed in year 1779 by Parshurambhau Patwardhan of Patwardhan dynasty. This structure is 425 ft long and 102 ft wide. The structure has 42 steps between the river and a covered stone structure. There used to be an underground passageway from the back of the ghat opening up near the river. It's believed that it was used by women in old days to reach the riverbank.
There is a beautiful temple of lord Shiva in the middle of the river, which is connected to the entire ghat. There's also another small temple between the ghat and a bridge nearby.

Educational Institutions
 Secondary School and Junior College
 Marathi Prathamik School, Bhilwadi
 Z. P. School 1
 Z. P. School 2
 Babasaheb Chitale Mahavidyalaya
English Primary & Highschool School, Bhilawadi
 Bharati Vidyapeeth (P.V.P.V.K.H)

Secondary  school & Jr. college, Bhilawadi has of Career Guidance Centre,
SSB-IAPT-ANVESHIKA, Bhilawadi,  Universal Science Club, Bhilawadi.

Transportation
By Air: Kolhapur Airport which is about 60 km from town which is connected by direct flights to Mumbai, Pune Airport. The land has been reserved for Sangli Airport for the industrial and business purpose which is still waiting for government order(s).

By Road: Bhilawadi town is well connected by road to the nearest cities Palus, Sangli, Tasgaon, Ashta, Islampur. NH4 Pune-Bangalore Highway is about 20 km away from the town which direct connects to Pune, Mumbai, Bangalore. Maharashtra State Road Transport Corporation (MSRTC) has facilitated the City Bus service to the town from Sangli and Miraj.

By Railway: Bhilawadi town has railway station by its own name Bhilawadi railway station, which facilitates connections to Pune, Mumbai, Sangli, Miraj, Kolhapur, Belgaum, Chennai, Hyderabad, Bangalore.

Agriculture
The farmers of the town mostly cultivate the Sugarcane, Grapes, Vegetables, Turmeric, Ground Nut and Soyabean. Sugarcane is the main crop in all seasons and the only town to cultivate quality sugarcane in the District.

Industry

By situating on the bank of river Krishna, Bhilawadi is also known for the production of Grapes, especially the "Sonakka, Sharad, Super Sonakka, Thomson, Dongari Sonakka varieties and Export Quality (Europe)" Grapes, Turmeric and large scale of Sugarcane production. Bhilawadi and region also rank the highest Milk producing town in the Sangli District with the number of types of milk products.

Industries in the Bhilawadi:

 B.G. Chitale Dairy.
 Chitale Agro Industries Pvt. Ltd.
 Chitale Foods and Sweets

 Patil Dairy & Milk Products 
 Bramha Dairy and Milk Products
 Karvi Milk and Milk Products
 Sangram Cane Agro Ltd. Bhilawadi

References

Cities and towns in Sangli district